The Australia men's national 3x3 team is a national basketball team of Australia, governed by Basketball Australia.

Competitions

Summer Olympics

3x3 World Cup

3x3 Asia Cup

Commonwealth Games

Honours

Medals table

Individual awards
 FIBA 3x3 Asia Cup MVP
 Tom Garlepp – 2018
 Tom Wright – 2019
 Jesse Wagstaff – 2022
 FIBA 3x3 Asia Cup All-Tournament Team
 Lucas Barker – 2017
 Tom Garlepp – 2018
 Tom Wright – 2019
 Jesse Wagstaff – 2022

See also

Australia women's national 3x3 team
 Australia men's national basketball team
 Australia women's national basketball team

References

Men's national 3x3 basketball teams
Australia men's national basketball team